Cefradine (INN) or cephradine (BAN) is a first generation  cephalosporin antibiotic.

Indications 
 Respiratory tract infections (such as tonsillitis, pharyngitis, and lobar pneumonia) caused by group A beta-hemolytic streptococci and S. pneumoniae (formerly D. pneumonia).
 Otitis media caused by group A beta-hemolytic streptococci, S. pneumoniae, H. influenzae, and staphylococci.
 Skin and skin structure infections caused by staphylococci (penicillin-susceptible and penicillin-resistant) and beta-hemolytic streptococci.
 Urinary tract infections, including prostatitis, caused by E. coli, P. mirabilis and Klebsiella species.

Formulations 
Cefradine is distributed in the form of capsules containing 250 mg or 500 mg, as a syrup containing 250 mg/5 ml, or in vials for injection containing 500 mg or 1 g.

It is not approved by the FDA for use in the United States.

Synthesis 
Birch reduction of D-α-phenylglycine led to diene (2). This was N-protected using tert-butoxycarbonylazide and activated for amide formation via the mixed anhydride method using isobutylchloroformate to give 3. Mixed anhydride 3 reacted readily with 7-aminodesacetoxycephalosporanic acid to give, after deblocking, cephradine (5).

Production names 
The antibiotic is produced under many brand names across the world.
 Bangladesh: Ancef, Ancef forte, Aphrin, Avlosef, Cefadin, Cephadin, Cephran, Cephran-DS, Cusef, Cusef DS, Dicef , Dicef forte, Dolocef, Efrad, Extracef, Extracef-DS, Intracef, Kefdrin, Lebac, Lebac Forte, Medicef, Mega-Cef, Megacin, Polycef, Procef, Procef, Procef forte, Rocef, Rocef Forte DS, Sefin, Sefin DS, Sefnin, Sefrad, Sefrad DS, Sefril, Sefril-DS, Sefro, Sefro-HS, Sephar, Sephar-DS, Septa, Sinaceph, SK-Cef, Sk-Cef DS, Supracef and Supracef-F, Torped, Ultrasef, Vecef, Vecef-DS, Velogen, Sinaceph, Velox
 China: Cefradine, Cephradine, Kebili, Saifuding, Shen You, Taididing, Velosef, Xianyi, and Xindadelei
 Colombia: Cefagram, Cefrakov, Cefranil , Cefrex, and Kliacef
 Egypt: Cefadrin, Cefadrine, Cephradine, Cephraforte, Farcosef, Fortecef, Mepadrin, Ultracef, and Velosef
 France: Dexef
 Hong Kong: Cefradine  and ChinaQualisef-250
 Indonesia: Dynacef, Velodine, and Velodrom
 Lebanon: Eskacef, Julphacef, and Velosef
 Lithuania: Tafril
 Myanmar: Sinaceph
 Oman: Ceframed, Eskasef, Omadine, and Velocef
 Pakistan: Abidine, Ada-Cef, Ag-cef, Aksosef, Amspor, Anasef, Antimic, Atcosef, Bactocef, Biocef, Biodine, Velora, Velosef
 Peru: Abiocef, Cefradinal, Cefradur, Cefrid, Terbodina II, Velocef, Velomicin
 The Philippines: Altozef, Racep, Senadex, Solphride, Yudinef, Zefadin, Zefradil, and Zolicef
 Poland: Tafril
 Portugal: Cefalmin, Cefradur
 South Africa: Cefril A
 South Korea: Cefradine and Tricef
 Taiwan: Cefadin, Cefamid, Cefin, Cekodin, Cephradine, Ceponin, Lacef, Licef-A, Lisacef, Lofadine, Recef, S-60, Sefree, Sephros, Topcef, Tydine, Unifradine, and U-Save
 UK: Cefradune (Kent)
 Vietnam: Eurosefro and Incef

Cefradine is known as Cefradina in Portuguese and Spanish and is produced by the following companies under this name: AC Farma, Peru; Andromaco, Chile; Anglopharma, Colombia; AZ Pharma, Colombia; Biogalenic, Venezuela; Bussié, Colombia; Elter - Medicamentos Genéricos, Venezuela; Farmindustria, Peru; Genfar, Colombia, Honduras and Peru; La Sante, Peru; La Santé, Colombia; Labesfal, Portugal; Lafrancol, Colombia; LCG, Peru; Marfan, Peru; Memphis, Colombia; Mintlab, Chile; MK, Colombia; Ophalac, Colombia; Procaps, Colombia and Vitalis, Colombia and Peru.

See also 
 Cephapirin
 Cephacetrile
 Cefamandole
 Ampicillin (Has the same chemical formula)

Notes

References 

Cephalosporin antibiotics
Enantiopure drugs